"Tu la love" is a song by French singer JuL, released on March 8, 2014 as him debut studio album Dans ma paranoïa

Music video
As of November 2022, the music video for Tu la love had over 24 million views on YouTube.

Charts

References

2014 songs
2014 singles
2014 debut singles